John Peel (22 August 1798 – 20 February 1875)  was Dean of Worcester from 1845 until his death.

The eighth child and fourth son of Sir Robert Peel, 1st Baronet he was educated at Christ Church, Oxford. He held the living at Stone, Worcestershire from 1828; and in the same year was appointed a Prebendary of Canterbury Cathedral.

References

1798 births
1875 deaths
Alumni of Christ Church, Oxford
Deans of Worcester